The 1981 Munster Senior Hurling Championship final was a hurling match played at Semple Stadium on 5 July 1981 to determine the winners of the 1981 Munster Senior Hurling Championship, the 94th season of the Munster Senior Club Hurling Championship, a tournament organised by the Munster Council of the Gaelic Athletic Association. The final was contested by Limerick and Clare, with Limerick winning by 3-12 to 2-9.

The Munster final between Limerick and Clare was the 4th Munster final meeting between the two teams. Limerick were hoping for their 16th Munster title and a second successive title. Clare were hoping for their 4th Munster title and their first win since 1932.

References

Munster Senior Hurling Championship Final
Clare county hurling team matches
Limerick county hurling team matches
Munster Senior Hurling Championship Finals